Haruchika (written: 治親 or 晴哉) is a masculine Japanese given name. Notable people with the name include:

 (born 1976), Japanese motorcycle racer
 (1911–1976), Japanese writer

Japanese masculine given names